Beaver Island Airport  is a public use airport located on Beaver Island in Charlevoix County, Michigan, United States. It is owned by St. James Township and Peaine Township. It is included in the Federal Aviation Administration (FAA) National Plan of Integrated Airport Systems for 2017–2021, in which it is categorized as a local general aviation facility.

Although many U.S. airports use the same three-letter location identifier for the FAA and IATA, this airport is assigned SJX by the FAA and no designation from the IATA (which assigned SJX to Sarteneja Airport in Sarteneja, Belize).

The airport received a $20,000 federal grant in 2020 as part of the CARES Act. The grant came in response to the COVID-19 pandemic to help the airport continue operations and upgrade facilities.

Facilities and aircraft 
Runways 14/32 and 5/23 are closed November through April, and also when snow-covered. Access to the airport is via Donnell Mor's Lane.

For the 12-month period ending December 31, 2019, the airport had 9,210 aircraft operations, an average of 25 per day: 60% air taxi and 40% general aviation. There are no aircraft currently based on the field.

The airport has a fixed-base operator that offers fuel, courtesy cars, conference rooms, a crew lounge, and more.

Airlines and destinations

Accidents and incidents
In 1988, an airplane crashed off this location.
On February 8, 2001, a Swearingen SA227 "Merlin" plane owned by Northern Illinois Flight Center that was landing from Chicago disappeared for 15 hours. Paul Welke, the owner of Island Airways, then flew as part of the rescue operation, finding 42 year old Mirth Gault and her children, ages 13, 9 and 5, alive next to the crashed aircraft debris. The crash killed both crew members.

References

External links 
   at Michigan DOT Airport Directory 
 Aerial image as of 1 May 1999 from USGS The National Map
 

Airports in Michigan
Buildings and structures in Charlevoix County, Michigan
Transportation in Charlevoix County, Michigan